Abū Muḥammad ʿAbd Allāh ibn Muslim ibn Qutayba al-Dīnawarī al-Marwazī better known simply as Ibn Qutaybah (c. 828 – 13 November 889 CE / 213 – 15 Rajab 276 AH) was an Islamic scholar of Persian descent. He served as a judge during the Abbasid Caliphate, but was best known for his contributions to Arabic literature. He was an Athari theologian and polymath who wrote on diverse subjects, such as Qur'anic exegesis, hadith, theology, philosophy, law and jurisprudence, grammar, philology, history, astronomy, agriculture and botany.

Biography
His full name is Abū Muḥammad ʿAbdullāh b. Muslim ibn Qutaybah ad-Dīnawarī. He was born in Kufa in what is now Iraq. He was of Persian descent; his father was from Merv, Khorasan. Having studied tradition and philology he became qadi in Dinawar during the reign of Al-Mutawakkil, and afterwards a teacher in Baghdad where he was tortured  and killed. He was the first representative of the school of Baghdad philologists that succeeded the schools of Kufa and Basra.  He was known as a vocal opponent of  "gentile" or shu'ubi Islam, i.e. openness to non-Islamic wisdom and values.

Legacy
He was viewed by Sunni Muslims as a hadith Master, foremost philologist, linguist, and man of letters. In addition to his literary criticism and anthologies, he was also known for his work in the problems of Tafsir or Qur'anic interpretation. He also authored works on astronomy and legal theory. His book Uyun al-Akhbar, along with the romantic literature of Muhammad bin Dawud al-Zahiri and Ibn Abi Tahir Tayfur, were considered by lexicographer Ibn Duraid to be the three most important works for those who wished to speak and write eloquently.

His work Taʾwīl mukhtalif al-ḥadīth was an influential early Atharite treatise that rebuked rationalists on the nature of Tradition. In his treatise, Ibn Qutayba censures the mutakallimūn (scholastic theologians) for holding contradictory and differing
views on the principles of religion.

Works
He wrote more than 60 books, including :
Gharīb al-Qur'an,  (var., Mushkil al-Qur'an), lexical complexities in the Qur'an.
Ta’wīl Mukhtalif al-Hadīth, (The Interpretation of Conflicting Narrations), defence of hadiths against Mu'tazilite critics.
Kitāb Adab al-Kātib (“Ibn Kutaiba’s Adab al-Kātib,” ed. Max Grünert, Leiden, 1900)
Kitāb al-Anwā’. (Hyderabad, 1956)
Kitāb al-Ma‘ānī al-Kabīr fī Abyāt al-Ma‘ānī. 2 vols. (Hyderabad, 1949)
Kitāb al-Ma’ārif, short universal history, from Creation to the Jāhiliyya (pre-Islamic); with index of the Companions, famous jurists and masters of hadīth („Ibn Coteiba’s Handbuch de Geschichte“, ed., Ferdinand Wüstenfeld, Gottingen, 1850); (ed., Tharwat ‘Ukāshah, Cairo, 1960).
Kitāb al-Shi‘r wa-al-Shu‘arā’ (“Liber Poësie et Poëtarum,”  ed., M. J de Goeje, Leiden, 1904)
Kitab ‘Uyūn al-Akhbār. 4 vols. (Cairo, 1925-30); biographic history of eminent figures.
Kitāb al-Amwāl
Kitāb al-‘Arab wa ‘Ulūmuhā; history of Arab scholars
Kitāb al-Ashriba; alcoholic beverages.
Kitāb Dalā’il al-Nubuwwa, or A‘lām al-Nubuwwa on the Proofs of the Prophets.
Kitāb Fad.l al-‘Arab ‘alā al-‘Ajam, in praise of the Arabs over the Persians.
Kitāb I‘rāb al-Qur’ān, a philological commentary on the Qur'ān.
Kitāb al-Ikhtilāf fī al-Lafz wa al-Radd ‘alā al-Jahmiyya wal-Mushabbiha, a refutation of the Allegorizers and Anthropomorphists. (Egypt,several editions)
Kitāb al-Ishtiqāq
Kitāb Is.lāh. Ghalat, corrections of Gharīb al-H.adīth by al-Qāsim ibn Salām.
Kitāb Jāmi‘ al-Fiqh, jurisprudence, dispraised as unreliable by al-T.abarī and Ibn Surayj, as was Ibn Qutayba’s al-Amwāl.
Kitāb Jāmi‘ al-Nah.w al-Kabīr and Jāmi‘ al-Nah.w al-S.aghīr
Kitāb al-Jarāthīm, linguistics.
Kitāb al-Jawābāt al-H.ād.ira.
Kitāb al-Ma‘ānī al-Kabīr
Kitāb al-Masā’il wal-Ajwiba.
Kitāb al-Maysar wal-Qidāh, ('Dice and Lots').
Kitāb al-Na‘m wal-Bahā’im, cattle and livestock.
Kitāb al-Nabāt, botany.
Kitāb al-Qirā’āt, ('The Canonical Readings').
Kitāb al-Radd ‘alā al-Qā’il bi Khalq al-Qur’ān, ('Against the creationist claims about the Qur’an').
Kitāb al-Radd ‘alā al-Shu‘aybiyya, ('Refutation of a sub-sect of the ‘Ajārida ‘At.awiyya, itself a sub-sect of the Khawārij).
Kitāb al-Rah.l wal-Manzil.
Kitāb Ta‘bīr al-Ru’yā, ('Interpretation of Dreams').
Kitāb Talqīn al-Muta‘allim min al-Nah.w on grammar.
Kitāb ‘Uyūn al-Shi‘r, on poetry.

See also
List of Islamic scholars
List of Iranian scientists and scholars
Al-Zahiriyah Library

Citations

References

External links

 A. Guellati, La notion d'adab chez Ibn Qutayba : étude générique et éclairage comparatiste (= Bibliothèque de l'Ecole des Hautes Etudes, Sciences Religieuses 169), Turnhout: Brepols, 2015, 
 
Imam Ibn Qutayba

820s births
885 deaths
9th-century Iranian historians
9th-century Muslim scholars of Islam
Atharis
Scholars from the Abbasid Caliphate
Arabic-language writers
Persian Sunni Muslim scholars of Islam
People from Kufa